Sural cutaneous nerve may refer to:

 Lateral sural cutaneous nerve
 Medial sural cutaneous nerve